Cempaka Schools is a private school in Malaysia that offers Early Years Education, the Primary & Secondary Malaysian and International (IGCSE Cambridge) curriculum, the International Baccalaureate Diploma Programme, and the A-Level for students aged from 18 months to 18 years old.

History 
 
Cempaka School was established in 1983 in a rented bungalow on Jalan Bukit Bintang in Kuala Lumpur, Malaysia. The founder and mentor, Dato' Freida Pilus, started it to provide the best possible education for her sons. Over the years, the school has grown and now comprises two main campuses situated in Bukit Damansara, Kuala Lumpur, and Taman Cheras Permata, Cheras.

Academic information

Early Childhood Education 
"Michelia" is the Early Childhood Education centre in Cempaka schools. It is located inside Cempaka International School's campus in Damansara Heights, Kuala Lumpur.

Divided into "Michelia Buds" for children aged between 18 months and 3 years old and "Michelia Reception" for children aged between 3 and 5 years old, the Early Childhood Education centre uses an inspired Reggio Emilia approach.

Primary School Education 
Cempaka International School Damansara Heights offers the British International Curriculum.

Secondary School Education 
Cempaka International School Damansara Heights primarily offers the Cambridge IGCSE Curriculum for all secondary students from Year 7 to Year 11 (Freshman to Junior 2). Computer Science and Business have chosen to take the Oxford AQA curriculum and examinations, while GCSE Physical Education is using Edexcel Pearson.

• Accounting

• Additional Mathematics

• Art and Design

• Biology

• Business

• Chemistry

• Computer Science

• Economics

• English as a Second Language

• First Language English

• French as a Foreign Language

• Global Perspectives

• Literature in English

• Mandarin as a Foreign Language

• Mandarin as a Second Language

• Malay as a Foreign Language

• Mathematics

• Physics

• Physical Education

A-Levels 
Cempaka School offers the following subjects in its A-Levels programme:

• Art and Design

• Biology

• Business

• Chemistry

• Economics

• English Language

• English Literature

• French Language

• Further Mathematics

• Mathematics

• Physics

Sports, co-curricular activities, and Expeditions

Sport houses 
The sport houses play a major role in the school life and students' development. All students, teachers, staff, and management are allocated into one of the four Houses, promoting inclusion and community spirit. Students represent their house in various sports, academic, and performing arts events throughout the year, part of the First House Cup (Secondary) and the Junior First House Cup (Primary).

Physical education 

The sports curriculum includes physical education (individual and team sports, athletics, outdoor  activities), swimming, gymnastics, and dance. In addition, students may choose to participate in the co-curricular activities offered during, after school or on the weekends.

Co-curricular activities 
Cempaka offers a wide and extensive range of co-curricular activities during school hours (for primary), after-school (for pre-school, primary and secondary), and on the weekends. Some of the CCA are: Football, Handball, Netball, Badminton, Swimming, Fencing, Table Tennis, Basketball, Gymnastics, Taekwondo, Ultimate Frisbee, Chess, Robotics, Coding, Public Speaking, Competitive debating, and others.

Cempaka School actively participates in ISSAM (International School Sports Association Malaysia) and MSSWPKL Inter-School competitions as well as other national and international tournaments.

GCSE Physical Education 
Pearson Edexcel GCSE Physical Education is an elective subject offered to Year 10 and Year 11 students in Cempaka International School Damansara Heights who are passionate about sports or considering a career in the sports industry. The 2-years course of study is a simplified Sport Science course, adapted for high school students.

Expeditions 
Alongside the single-day field trips, Cempaka offers six different levels of multi-day trips called "Expeditions" both within Malaysia and Internationally. The expeditions are an integral part of the Cempaka Awards Scheme, a programme consisting of eight sections (Community service, School events, Sports, Skills, Academic arena, Society, Expeditions, and Life-saving), designed towards well-rounded development.

Primary School Expeditions 

 Campori
 Junior Heritage Camp

Secondary School Expeditions 

 Bronze Expedition
 Silver Expedition
 Gold Expedition
 Platinum Expedition

School team jerseys

Notable achievements

Academic 
In 2021 the school has reported 58% A*s, 79% A*As, 91% A*AB, and 100% passes in IGCSE as well as 80% A*As in A-Level examinations and an average of 41 out of 45 points in the International Baccalaureate.

In the World Education Games, a global online event with a total participation of 5.9 million students, Cempaka Schools Malaysia has 9 world trophies in three categories - literacy, mathematics, and science, both in the individual events and as a school.

Sports 
 A record-breaking UIPM Laser-run event was held in 2018 at Cempaka Cheras to mark the school's 35th anniversary. With a total of 636 participants, this is the largest laser-run event in the world.

Performing arts 
 
Cempaka Performing Arts Company (CPAC) is establish in the Year 2000 to manage the performing arts curriculum of Cempaka Schools. Cempaka schools has provided a well-structured curriculums for students by incorporating music, dance and theatre. Students are given opportunity to be involved in recorded performances and to perform on live shows. In 2017, Cempaka was recognized by The Malaysia Book of Records for being the first school to stage an original musical at a professional level for producing Alice's Wonderland by Cempaka Performing Arts Company (est. 2000). CPAC has also won numerous awards from Boh Cameronian Arts Awards.

Cempaka Schools Box Office Productions 

 2005  Simba, King of the Jungle
 2006  We Will Rock You
 2007  Witches of Oz
 2008  West Side Story
 2009  Fame, the Musical
 2010  Beauty & the Beast
 2011  Seussical, the Musical
 2012  Hairspray, the Musical
 2013  Tarzan, the Musical
 2014  Wedding Singer, the Musical - Awarded Best Ensemble (BOH Cameronian Arts Awards).
 2015  Annie, the Musical - Awarded Best Ensemble, Principal Role, Direction and Production Design (BOH Cameronian Arst Awards).
 2016 Legally Blonde, the Musical
 2017 CPAC's Alice's Wonderland - Our first original musical theatre production. Recognised in the Malaysia Book of Records.
 2018 Happy Days, the Musical
 2019 CPAC's Dames & Dimes - Awarded Best Costume Design and Best Set Design (BOH Cameronian Arts Awards)
 2021 Practically Perfect - CPAC First Virtual Musical

References

External links 
 

1983 establishments in Malaysia
International schools in Selangor
International schools in Kuala Lumpur
Primary schools in Malaysia
Private schools in Malaysia
Secondary schools in Malaysia